Akberda (Aqbirźe) is a rural locality (a village) in Ibrayevsky Selsoviet, Alsheyevsky District, Bashkortostan, Russia. The population was 73 as of 2010. There is 1 street.

Geography 
Akberda is located 8 km southeast of Rayevsky (the district's administrative centre) by road. Starosepyashevo is the nearest rural locality.

References 

Rural localities in Alsheyevsky District